The Grodno Governorate, was a governorate of the Russian Empire. It was part of the Vilna Governorate-General and Northwestern Krai.

Overview
Grodno, a western province or governorate of the former Russian Empire, currently located in Belarus, was situated between about 52° to 54° N latitude and 21° to 24° E longitude, and bounded N by Vilna E by Minsk S by Volhynia and W by the former kingdom of Poland. The province was a wide plain in parts, very swampy and covered with large pine tree forests. Of these, that of Białowieża in the district of comprising a circuit of over  deserves notice. There, bisons were preserved. The navigable rivers are Niemen, Bug, Narev, and Bobra, the most important of those being the Bug. The soil is chiefly alluvial intermixed with sand waws, which was favorable for agriculture anil, rearing of cattle and bees. The atmosphere was damp, misty and the climate in winter was cold. Large quantities of rye, barley, oats, hops, hemp and flax were raised but the amount of fruit and vegetables grown was small. The products produced in the region were insignificant, but included woolen cloths, hats, leather, paper and spirits. There also a good export trade in grain, wool, cattle. Some forty fairs were held annually in the province.

It was divided into nine districts:

 Grodno,
 Brest,
 Bielsk,
 Volkovysk,
 Kobryn,
 Prushana,
 Slonim 
 and Belostok. 

The administration of the whole province was in the governor appointed by the crown. In 1870 the population was 1,008,521 comprising Lithuanians, Poles, Belarusians, Tartars, and a few German colonists. Grodno's capital was Grodno, on the right bank of the Niemen, and was connected by railway with Moscow and Warsaw. It contained eight Roman Catholic, one Eastern and two United Greek Catholic churches, a chapel, and two Jewish synagogues. There were two fine erected respectively by Stephen Batory who died here 1586 and Augustus III (kings of Poland). Among other buildings were a public library, a school of a gymnasium, and several seminaries. The 24,789 were engaged in the manufacture of woolen hats, paper, and the preparation of wax. Three fairs were held annually.

Grodno was built in the 12th century until 1795 belonged to the Grand Duchy of Lithuania. The diet held there in 1793 ratified the partition of Poland. Two years later Stanislaus, the last king, signed his abdication there.

Administrative divisions
The seat was in Grodno. It divided into 9 Uyzeds:
Grodnensky Uyezd
Belostoksky Uyezd
Belsky Uyezd
Brestsky Uyezd
Kobrinsky Uyezd
Pruzhansky Uyezd
Sokolsky Uyezd
Slonimsky Uyezd
Volkovyssky Uyezd

History

Slonim Governorate (1795–1796)
The governorate was formed in 1796, in the aftermath of the final partition of Polish-Lithuanian Commonwealth, and originally known as Slonim Governorate, but that only existed until December 12, 1796, when Paul I merged it with Vilna Governorate to form Lithuania Governorate.

The Slonim Governorate had 8 provinces:
 Brest
 Volkovysskij
 Grodno
 Kobrin
 Lida
 Novogrudok
 Pruzhany
 Slonimsky

Lithuania Governorate (1796–1801)

Just a year later, on December 12, 1796, by order of Tsar Paul I they were merged into one governorate, called the Lithuanian Governorate, with its capital in Vilnius.

Lithuania-Grodno Governorate (1801–1840)
After Paul's death, by order of Tsar Alexander I on September 9, 1801, the Lithuanian Governorate was split into the Lithuania-Vilnius Governorate and the Lithuania-Grodno Governorate. The Lithuania-Grodno Governorate was restored within the borders of 1796 Slonim Governorate.

The Lithuania-Grodno Governorate had 8 provinces:
 Brest
 Volkovysskij
 Grodno
 Kobrin
 Lida
 Novogrudok
 Pruzhany
 Slonimsky
Sokolka Province

Grodno Governorate (1840–1870)
In 1840 the word "Lithuania" was dropped from the name by Nicholas I.

In 1843, another administrative reform took place. The Vilnius Governorate received the Lida district from the Grodno Governorate  and the Belostok Oblast was incorporated into it as the districts of Belostok, Belsk and Sokolka. Also, Novogrudok one to Minsk Governorate

The Grodno Governorate had 9 provinces:
 Brest
 Volkovysskij
 Grodno
 Kobrin
 Pruzhany
 Slonimsky
Belostok Province
Belsk Province
Sokolka Province

Bialystok-Grodno District (1915–1917)

The Grodno Governorate was occupied by Germany in 1915 during World War I. It was known as the Bialystok-Grodno District of Ober-Ost. After the Peace of Riga on 18 March 1921, which ended the Polish-Soviet War, the governorate became the voivodeships of Białystok, Nowogródek and Polesie of the Second Polish Republic.

Governors
General Maurice de Lacy of Grodno (died 1820)
Mikhail Nikolayevich Muravyov-Vilensky (1830–1831)

External links

Grodno Gubernia
Gardinas (Grodno) 1919

 
Governorates of the Russian Empire
Grodno
1795 establishments in the Russian Empire